The economy of São Tomé and Príncipe, while traditionally dependent on cocoa, is experiencing considerable changes due to investment in the development of its oil industry in the oil-rich waters of the Gulf of Guinea.

History
Under Portuguese colonial rule, sugar plantations were set up, and the islands were used for the transshipment of slaves.

Oil reserves 

Geologists estimate that the Gulf of Guinea zone (Niger Delta province) holds more than 10 billion barrels (1.6 km³) of oil, although no reserves have yet been proven. A joint oil project with Nigeria in 2005 is likely to contribute $50 million of revenues to the government from the exploration licence signing fees. This represents four times government revenues in 2004. São Tomé is optimistic that significant petroleum discoveries under the exploration licence are forthcoming, though no crude oil nor natural gas has been found as of 2021.

Agriculture 

Since the 1800s, the economy of São Tomé and Príncipe has been based on plantation agriculture. At the time of independence, Portuguese-owned plantations occupied 90% of the cultivated area. After independence, control of these plantations passed to various state-owned agricultural enterprises. The dominant crop on São Tomé is cocoa, representing about 95% of exports. Other export crops include copra, palm kernels, and coffee.

Economic issues

The government has an economic program that is supported by the IMF, via its Extended Credit Facility arrangement.

Data

Gross domestic product:
purchasing power parity -  $316.9 million (2010 est.), $214 million (2003 est.)

GDP - real growth rate: 6% (2010 est.), 5% (2004 est.)

GDP - per capita:
purchasing power parity - $1,800 (2010 est.), $1,200 (2003 est.)

Unemployment rate: 12.2% in the formal business sector (2017 est.)

Budget:
revenues: $58 million
expenditures: $114 million, including capital expenditures of $54 million (1993 est.)

Industries: light construction, textiles, soap, beer; fish processing; timber

Agriculture - products:
cocoa, coconuts, palm kernels, copra, cinnamon, pepper, coffee, bananas, papayas, beans; poultry; fish

Exports:
$13 million (2010 est.)

Exports - commodities:
cocoa 80%, copra, coffee, palm oil (2009)

Exports - partners:
United Kingdom 32.99%, Netherlands 26.93%, Belgium 21.04%, Portugal 4.31% (2009)

Imports:
$127.7 million (2017 est.)

Petroleum - it needs to import all of its required petroleum

See also

 Cuisine of São Tomé and Príncipe
 United Nations Economic Commission for Africa

References

External links
São Tome and Principe latest trade data on ITC Trade Map
Agência Nacional do Petróleo de São Tomé e Príncipe
CIA - The World Factbook -- Sao Tome and Principe
https://theodora.com/wfbcurrent/sao_tome_and_principe/sao_tome_and_principe_economy.html

 
São Tomé and Príncipe